The Best of The Gap Band is the 16th album released in 1995 on Mercury. The album includes the most popular hits of the band.

Track listing

References

2021 albums
The Gap Band albums
Mercury Records compilation albums